Swinley is an urban suburb of Wigan, Greater Manchester. The area was mainly developed during the late Victorian and Edwardian period from around 1885 up until the end of the interwar period upon a green corridor centred on the section of the Chester to Lancaster Roman Road named Wigan Lane which leads northwards from the original 1246 Royal Charter boundary of the Borough of Wigan towards the parish of Standish between neighbouring industrial areas of mills, mines and ironworks. It originally featured a hodgepodge development of villa's, flats and large town houses on what was then open fields, later stages of development during the interwar period infilled with terraces. The area to the east of Wigan Lane abuting Douglas Valley retains this exclusive character with properties selling from £500,000 to over a million.

Wigan was one of the four boroughs in Lancashire alongside Liverpool, Lancaster and Preston to receive a royal charter. The borough was chartered to be the triangle of land formed by the river Douglas as it passes around the hill upon which the town was built, this hill now forms the town centre. Overspill development always existed on the roads approaching the town and by the time of the industrial revolution many traders and residents had set up just beyond the 'gates' where they were free of borough taxation.

In 1651 during the English Civil War the Battle of Wigan Lane was fought between 3000 Roundheads under Colonel Robert Lilburne and 1500 Royalists under the Early of Derby. The location where Sir Thomas Tyldesley fell on Wigan Lane is marked by the Tyldesley war monument erected in 1679. Battle damage can still be seen on the tower of All Saints' Church, Wigan Parish church.

In 1878 Mesnes Park, begun in 1871, was completed replacing two collieries and tramlines on land belonging to the Rector of Wigan Parish (the Rectors Demesne giving rise to the name Mesnes), Bridgeman Terrace was built overlooking the park in 1876 and with public transport from existing tramlines this may have kickstarted the areas suburbanisation. The Victorian Gothic grade II* listed St Michaels and All Angels parish church was completed in 1878 next to Swinley Hall which has not survived. In 1881 the parish of Swinley (which included Whitley) was formed at St Michaels under the jurisdiction of the Rector of Wigan Parish. Under the Local Government Act 1888 in 1889 the County Borough of Wigan was formed replacing the Municipal Borough of Wigan and incorporating all the lands of Wigan and from 1904 Pemberton parishes which had formerly been outside the towns municipal boundaries. In 1974 the County Borough of Wigan was dissolved and the Metropolitan Borough of Wigan was formed within the county of Greater Manchester.

Swinley is bounded to the west by the tracks of the West Coast Main Line, to the south by Wigan Town Centre. To the east the course of the river Douglas in leafy Douglas Valley (which at the time featured industrial ironworks) and Haigh Country Park separate it from the suburb of Whelley. To the North West the land between Spencer Road and the west of Wigan Lane (including Whitley Crescent and Trinity United Reformed Church) forms the small similarly affluent suburb of Whitley centered on Whitley Reservoir. The 1894 OS Map lists Whitley Reservoirs origin as a gravel pit surrounded by country lanes and the suburb developed at the same time as Swinley between the late Victorian and First World War in the arts and crafts style to a preplanned grid. Meanwhile, Swinley continues northwards on the west side of Wigan Lane until it reaches Standish at the Boars Head Resorvoir.

The population of Swinley is around 11,000 people and the area is mainly residential, alongside offices and a main high street on Wigan Lane. The area also contains the large Royal Albert Edward Infirmary, Victorian Mesnes Park, Cricket, Tennis and Bowls clubs and a Tesco Extra supermarket built on the former site of Central Park the Wigan Warriors previous stadium.

References 

Geography of the Metropolitan Borough of Wigan